What Money Can Buy is a 1928 British silent drama film directed by Edwin Greenwood and starring Madeleine Carroll, Humberston Wright and John Longden. The screenplay concerns a man who makes a bet that he can seduce a woman.

Plot
A rake makes a bet that he can seduce a woman if he offers her enough money.

Cast
 Madeleine Carroll - Rhoda Pearson 
 Humberston Wright - Reverend Dennis Norton 
 John Longden - Ralph Tresham 
 Alf Goddard - Alf 
 Cecil Barry - James Lorrimer 
 Maudie Dunham - Mrs. Lorrimer 
 Anita Sharp-Bolster - Cleaner 
 Judd Green - Client

References

Bibliography
 Low, Rachael. History of the British Film, 1918-1929. George Allen & Unwin, 1971.

External links

1928 films
British silent feature films
Films directed by Edwin Greenwood
1928 drama films
British drama films
Films shot at Lime Grove Studios
British films based on plays
British black-and-white films
1920s English-language films
1920s British films
Silent drama films